Weißensee (Füssen) is a lake in Allgäu, Bavaria, Germany. At an elevation of 787.3 m, its surface area is 134.65 ha.

External links 
 
 Weissensee, Article

Lakes of Bavaria